The Friedrichshafen FF.27 was a reconnaissance floatplane built in Germany during World War I.

Design and development
The FF.27 was a two-seat floatplane of mixed construction which had a single NAG 6-cyl 135hp piston engine mounted in the center nacelle. The tail empennage extended out from the fuselage via twin metal booms and the FF.27 had of pair of floats mounted under the center wing section.

The first flight of the FF.27 took place in 1914, occurring in response to the Baltic Ostsee-Wettbewerb 1914 aviation contest. After the outbreak of WWI, the FF.27 was delivered to the Imperial German Navy and given the serial 62, being used for reconnaissance duties.

Specifications

References

Bibliography

1910s German military reconnaissance aircraft
Biplanes
Single-engined tractor aircraft
Floatplanes
FF.27
Aircraft first flown in 1914